Ricardo Eloy Machado (October 5, 1923 – April 6, 2010) was an Argentine actor. Born in Buenos Aires, he acted in radio, movies, theater and TV.  He died in Buenos Aires, Argentina, on April 6, 2010. He was married to actress Noemí Laserre and their daughter is the actress Estela Molly.

Filmography
 La increíble historia de Asterión y Clotilda (2003) .... Asterión
 Pasaje al paraíso (2003) .... Ángel
 La clínica loca (1988)
 Mujer - Mujer (1987) ....
 Todo o nada (1984)
 La rabona (1979)
 La obertura (1977)
 La gran aventura (1974)
 Porcelandia (1974) Serie
 El picnic de los Campanelli (1972)
 Estoy hecho un demonio (1972)
 Pimienta y pimentón (1970)
 Pimienta (1966) .... Doctor Peña
 El mago de las finanzas (1962)
 Dos basuras (1958)
 Isla hechizada (1955)
 El túnel (1952)
 La comedia inmortal (1951)
 Captura recomendada (1950)
 Juan Globo (1949)

Televisión
 Chiquititas  (2 episodios, 1998–1999)
- Episode #5.1 (1999) .... Joaquín Maza
- Episode #4.1 (1998).... Don Michell
 Como pan caliente (1996) Serie .... Fermín
 Chiquilina mía (1991) Serie.... Padre Julián
 Brigada cola (1990) Serie
 El hombre que amo (1986) Serie .... Beto
 Momento de incertidumbre (1985) Serie (unknown episodes)
 Historia de un trepador (1984) Serie .... Bruno
 El Rafa (1981) Serie.... Pascual
 Andrea Celeste (1979) Serie.... Fernando (unknown episodes)
 Porcelandia (1974) Comic Program: Jorge Porcel, Diana Maggi, Beto Gianola, y Ricardo Lavié.
 El sátiro (1963) mini-serie
 Ellos dos y alguién más (1962)
 El último pecado (1962)

References

1923 births
2010 deaths
Argentine male film actors
Argentine painters
Argentine male painters
Argentine male stage actors
Argentine male television actors
Male actors from Buenos Aires
Argentine male radio actors
20th-century Argentine male actors
21st-century Argentine male actors
Burials at La Chacarita Cemetery